Elijah Mundo is a fictional character in CSI: Cyber. Elijah is Avery's (Patricia Arquette) second in command. He is a former U.S. marine and an expert in battlefield forensics, weaponry, vehicles and bombs. He is portrayed by James Van Der Beek.

Creation
On August 6, 2014, Van Der Beek was cast as Mundo, described as "a savant when it comes to weaponry, vehicles and bombs. A self-proclaimed action junkie, [who] will often put himself at risk to seek permanent justice, while Ryan will level his die-hard behavior with her expertise in psychology."

Speaking about his role to Time, James said "I feel like I signed with the New York Yankees. I feel like I'm wearing pinstripes to work everyday. It's probably the biggest franchise in all of television right now."

Background
Elijah was a U.S. marine. He has a daughter named Michelle with his ex-wife, Devon Atwood.

Storylines
In "Kidnapping 2.0", Elijah is first seen playing an arcade game. Elijah travels with Avery, Brody (Shad Moss) and Daniel Krumitz to Baltimore to investigate a missing baby. It then was discovered that they were investigating a baby-trafficking ring. In the climax of the case, when two suspects drove their car into a lake, Elijah swam to rescue the baby.
In "CMND:\Crash", Elijah finds it difficult to live without his daughter full time. During the crime, Mundo stops a bomb from blowing up a train by risking his life by stopping it underneath the train.
In "Fire Code" Elijah is upset to learn that Devon wants to take Michelle to San Diego full time.
In "URL Interrupted", Mundo helps Avery find a missing teenage girl who is being bullied.
In "Family Secrets" Mundo leads the operation to save Avery from the hands of stalker, Logan Reeves.
In "Why-Fi", Mundo discovers that his father has cancer but is refusing treatment.

References

CSI: Cyber characters
Television characters introduced in 2015
Fictional Federal Bureau of Investigation personnel
Fictional soldiers